The Crisis is a 1916 American silent historical drama film produced by William N. Selig and directed by Colin Campbell. The film is based on the American Civil War novel The Crisis by American novelist Winston Churchill. The novel was adapted into a play and produced on Broadway in 1902.

A copy of this film is preserved at the Library of Congress.

Cast
 George Fawcett - Judge Silas Whipple
 Matt B. Snyder - Col. Comyn Carvel
 Bessie Eyton - Virginia Carvel
 Tom Santschi - Stephen Brice
 Eugenie Besserer - Mrs. Brice
 Marshall Neilan - Clarence Colfax
 Frank Weed - Eliphalet Hopper
 Will Machin - Lige Brent
 Sam D. Drane - Abraham Lincoln
 Cecil Holland - Gen. W. T. Sherman
 Leo Pierson - Jack Brinsmade
 George Snyder -
 Frank Green -
 Alfred E. Green - Carl Richter
 Tom Mix - stunts (uncredited)

Reception

The Crisis sought to mine the success of 1915's The Birth of a Nation.  It was popular in theatres, but the United States' entry into World War I in April 1917 effectively ended interest in another Civil War film in light of the new war.

Production notes
The production was shot in part in Mississippi and St. Louis, Missouri. Actor Matt B. Snyder was a real-life Civil War veteran having served in the Union Navy on the gunship USS Essex. Snyder and Sam D. Drane, who portrayed Abraham Lincoln in the film, died prior to its general release in 1917.

References

External links
 
 
 
 
The Crisis ; Mississippi's First Civil War Film

1916 films
1910s historical drama films
1910s war drama films
American black-and-white films
American Civil War films
American historical drama films
American silent feature films
American war drama films
Films based on American novels
Films based on military novels
Films directed by Colin Campbell
Films set in Mississippi
Films set in the 1850s
Films set in the 1860s
Films shot in Mississippi
Films shot in Missouri
Selig Polyscope Company films
Surviving American silent films
1916 drama films
1917 drama films
1917 films
1910s American films
Silent American drama films
Silent war drama films